José Zalabardo (born 1964) is a Spanish-British philosopher who works on epistemology, metaphysics, and related areas. He is a professor of philosophy at University College London. He was Head of the UCL Philosophy Department from 2014 to 2018.

Life
Zalabardo was born in Madrid, and grew up in Madrid and Zaragoza. He obtained his licenciatura from the Universidad Autónoma de Madrid, his MPhil from the University of St Andrews and his PhD in 1994 from the University of Michigan, where he studied with Crispin Wright and Paul Boghossian. From 1994 to 2000 he taught at the University of Birmingham. From 2000 he has taught at University College London, first as a lecturer, then as a reader, and now as a professor. Zalabardo is a recreational sailor, painter, and saxophonist.

Books 
Authored books
 
 Spanish translation: 
 
 
 
 

Edited book

References

External links 
 Personal webpage
 PhilPapers profile
 Interview
 Interview in 3:AM magazine

1964 births
20th-century British male writers
20th-century British philosophers
20th-century educators
20th-century essayists
20th-century saxophonists
20th-century Spanish male writers
20th-century Spanish philosophers
20th-century translators
21st-century British male writers
21st-century British philosophers
21st-century educators
21st-century essayists
21st-century saxophonists
21st-century Spanish male artists
21st-century Spanish male writers
21st-century Spanish philosophers
21st-century translators
Academics of the University of Birmingham
Academics of University College London
Alumni of the University of St Andrews
Analytic philosophers
Autonomous University of Madrid alumni
British educators
British logicians
British male essayists
British male non-fiction writers
British male painters
British male saxophonists
British sailors
British sceptics
British translators
Epistemologists
Lecturers
Living people
Male saxophonists
Metaphysicians
Metaphysics writers
Ontologists
People from Madrid
Philosophers of education
Philosophers of logic
Philosophers of social science
Philosophy academics
Spanish educators
Spanish essayists
Spanish male non-fiction writers
Spanish male painters
Spanish sailors
Spanish saxophonists
Spanish translators
University of Michigan alumni
Wittgensteinian philosophers